"Follow Me" is a song by Dutch DJ and record producer Hardwell, featuring American singer Jason Derulo. The song is the seventh and last single of Hardwell's debut studio album, United We Are. It was released on 7 August 2015 by Central Station Records. It peaked on the Australian Singles Chart at number 26, making it the first Hardwell release to chart in Australia.

Background
Hardwell says it was the first time he had ever made a track over Skype. He said he was in Breda whilst Derulo was in Miami and "it as a back and forth thing".

When speaking of the collaboration, Hardwell said; "Getting the chance to work with Jason on this album was a dream moment for me. I've been a huge fan of his work for a long time now. I had the idea of the track I wanted to make with him for a while; combining my sound and style with his distinct voice and lyrical flair, it was always going to be something special".

Derulo said; "When Hardwell and I decided to work together, I knew the potential of what we would be able to create was incredible, but "Follow Me" is a game changer that I can't wait to share with the fans".

Music video
A music video to accompany the release of "Follow Me" was first released onto YouTube on 17 July 2015 at a total length of four minutes and four seconds.

Chart performance

Certifications

References 

2015 singles
2014 songs
Songs written by Jason Derulo
Jason Derulo songs
Songs written by James Abrahart
Hardwell songs
Songs written by Hardwell